Metappana is a genus of moths of the family Noctuidae.

Species
 Metappana crescentica (Hampson, 1910)

References
Natural History Museum Lepidoptera genus database
Metappana at funet

Hadeninae